Nigeria competed at the 1984 Summer Olympics in Los Angeles, United States.

Medalists

Results by event

Athletics
Men's 400 metres 
 Sunday Uti 
 Heat — 45.74
 Quarterfinals — 45.01
 Semifinals — 44.83
 Final — 44.93 (→ 6th place)

 Innocent Egbunike 
 Heat — 46.63
 Quarterfinals — 45.26
 Semifinals — 45.16
 Final — 45.35 (→ 7th place)

Men's 400 m Hurdles
 Henry Amike
 	
Men's 4 × 100 m Relay
Isiaq Adeyanju
Eseme Ikpoto
Samson Oyeledun
Chidi Imoh
Lawrence Adegbeingbe

Men's 4 × 400 m Relay
Sunday Uti
Hope Ezeigbo
Felix Imadiyi
Dele Udo

Men's Long Jump
 Yusuf Alli
 Qualification — 7.82m
 Final — 7.78m (→ 9th place)

 Jubobaraye Kio
 Qualification — 7.76m
 Final — 7.57m (→ 12th place)

Men's Triple Jump
 Ajayi Agbebaku
 Final — 16.67m (→ 7th place)

 Joseph Taiwo
 Paul Emordi

Women's Marathon 
Ifeoma Mbanugo 
 Final — did not finish (→ no ranking)

Women's 100m Hurdles 
 Maria Usifo

Women's 400m Hurdles 
 Maria Usifo
 Heat — 57.58 
 Semifinal — 58.55 (→ did not advance)

Boxing
Men's Bantamweight (– 54 kg)
Joe Orewa
 First Round — Bye
 Second Round — Defeated Wanchai Pongsri (Thailand), knock-out in second round
 Third Round — Lost to Héctor López (Mexico), 1-4

Men's Featherweight (– 57 kg)
Peter Konyegwachie
 First Round — Bye
 Second Round — Defeated Ali Faki (Malawi), 5-0
 Third Round — Defeated Rafael Zuñiga (Colombia), 4-1
 Quarterfinals — Defeated Charles Lubulwa (Uganda), 5-0
 Semi finals — Defeated Türgüt Aykaç (Turkey), 5-0
 Final — Lost to Meldrick Taylor (United States), 0-5

Men's Lightweight (– 60 kg)
Christopher Ossai

Men's Light-Welterweight (– 63.5 kg)
Charles Nwokolo

Men's Welterweight (– 67 kg)
Roland Omoruyi

Men's Middleweight (– 75 kg)
Jerry Okorodudu

Weightlifting
Men's Featherweight
Lawrence Iquaibom

Men's Lightweight
Patrick Bassey

Men's Middle-Heavyweight
Emmanuel Oshomah

Men's Heavyweight I
Oliver Orok

Men's Super-Heavyweight
Batholomew Oluoma
Ironbar Bassey

Wrestling
Men's Welterweight Freestyle
Seidu Olawale

Men's Middleweight Freestyle
Kally Agogo

Men's Light-Heavyweight Freestyle
Macauley Appah

See also
 Nigeria at the 1982 Commonwealth Games
 Nigeria at the 1986 Commonwealth Games

References

Official Olympic Reports
International Olympic Committee results database
sports-reference

Nations at the 1984 Summer Olympics
1984
Olympic Games